UseModWiki is a wiki software written in Perl and licensed under the GNU General Public License. Pages in UseModWiki are stored in ordinary files, not in a relational database. Wikipedias in English and many other languages were powered by UseModWiki until switching to MediaWiki.

History 

After Ward Cunningham created the first wiki website WikiWikiWeb, there were various "WikiWikiClones" that implemented the functions and design of WikiWikiWeb's engine ("WikiBase"), mainly written in Perl. Peter Merel developed CVWiki which was an early WikiWikiClone released partially under the GNU Lesser General Public License, and Markus Denker then developed AtisWiki which was released under the GNU General Public License and based on CVWiki.

In the 1990s, Clifford Adams initiated the Usenet Moderation project that would allow users to share rating, editing, and eventually summary/change information about Usenet postings. It was replaced by the concept of wikis in 1999, and the development of UseModWiki started on October 11 as a simplified fork of AtisWiki. From version 0.4 ("WikiFour") in November 1999, more functions and improvements were introduced to UseModWiki. In 2000, the second UseModWiki website MeatballWiki was launched and hosted in usemod.com, along with the official website of UseModWiki.

In 2001, as Adams was both of the UseModWiki developer and a Wikipedian, he brought many improvements for the usages of an encyclopedia to v0.91 and v0.92, especially "free links" that uses double square-brackets (e.g., [[Wikipedia]]) as an option along with camel case for linking to another page. In September 2003, after two years of development, the release of version 1.0 introduced many new features including CSS, RSS, file uploads, UTF-8, and more. Only bug fixing versions were released since that, and Markus Lude took over the project of UseModWiki from Adams in July 2007. The latest version was released in December 2017.

The wiki software for the English Wikipedia was UseModWiki (phase I, retroactively) since the establishment on January 15, 2001, and as of January 2002, Wikipedias in 22 languages were powered by UseModWiki. It was replaced by "the PHP script" (phase II) on January 25, 2002, a new wiki software based on UseModWiki but rewritten in PHP. On July 20, it was then replaced by its own rewritten wiki software (phase III), currently known as MediaWiki, for the better performance and functionality.

Version history

See also 

 List of wiki engines
 mw:MediaWiki history

References

External links 

 
 List of sites running UseModWiki
 Introducing UseModWiki

1999 software
Cross-platform software
Free wiki software
Free software programmed in Perl
History of Wikipedia